Marvin's Marvelous Mechanical Museum is the debut studio album by American rock band Tally Hall, originally released on October 24, 2005. Their previous recordings were all independently produced and distributed demos. All of the tracks on the album are finished versions of their demo tracks, with the exception of "Haiku," which is a completely new song. The album gets its name from a museum of mechanized curiosities that is located in Farmington Hills, Michigan. The album's cover art is also based on a number of machines located within the museum.

The album was officially re-released on September 12, 2006, under the Quack! Media label. This re-release coincided with additional publicity on MTV, national distribution in all major retail stores, and various other TV appearances including The Late Late Show with Craig Ferguson. The music video for "Good Day" was first shown at Tally Hall's two Ann Arbor concerts on September 23, 2006.

Tally Hall was later signed with Atlantic Records, and was approved to re-record Marvin's Marvelous Mechanical Museum at Stratosphere Sound Recording Studios in NYC. The remastered version of the album was released in April 2008, with "Good Day" being released as a single. The album received generally positive reviews.

"Good Day" 
The single "Good Day" from the new version of the album was released on February 26, 2008. The re-recorded version of the album was released on April 1, 2008. This release also included a vinyl LP pressing of the album. It was reissued on vinyl, cassette, and CD by Needlejuice Records on March 13, 2021.

"Good Day" was written by Andrew Horowitz and won a prize of $10,000 with the 2004 BMI John Lennon Scholarship for "the best and brightest young songwriters between the ages of 15 and 24".

The song was featured on The Late, Late Show with Craig Ferguson. The song was also featured in the April 6, 2006, episode of The O.C., a prime-time drama series. A "simlish" version of "Good Day" was created for use in The Sims 2. This version of "Good Day" was later featured as a new hidden track on the pregap of the Needlejuice Records CD rerelease of Marvin's Marvelous Mechanical Museum.

Track listing

Notes
On vinyl & cassette releases of the album, "The Whole World and You" is track 7. "The Whole World and You" is the last of side A on the vinyl, rather than track 12, and on cassette editions, "Banana Man" is the last track of side A.

Personnel

Tally Hall
Rob Cantor – vocals, guitar, ukulele, percussion, songwriting
Joe Hawley – vocals, guitar, ukulele, songwriting
Zubin Sedghi – bass, vocals, co-songwriting (3)
Andrew Horowitz – keyboards, percussion, vocals, songwriting
Ross Federman – drums, percussion, vocals (16), auctioneer voice (5)

Other musicians

Alison Kartush – backing vocals (4, 12)
Andrew Papas – backing vocals (4, 12)
Ashley Hurst – backing vocals (4, 12)
Bora Karaca – backing vocals (1, 5, 7), whistling (7)
Brett Trzcinski – backing vocals (1, 5, 7)
Caitlyn Thomson – backing vocals (4, 12)
Claire Smith – backing vocals (4, 12)
Donald Milton III – backing vocals (1, 5, 7)
Emily Barkin – backing vocals (4, 12)
Greg Jaffe – backing vocals (1, 5, 7)
Jason Ceo – backing vocals (1, 5, 7)
Jessica Fetter – backing vocals (4, 12)
Jon Zande – backing vocals (1, 5, 7)
Karl Pestka – backing vocals (4, 12)
Lisa Bakale-Wise – backing vocals (4, 12)
Michael Anuzis – backing vocals (4, 12)
Michael Steelman – backing vocals (1, 5, 7)
Rebecca Blinder – backing vocals (4, 12)
Stephanie Fajuri – backing vocals (4, 12)
Tim Wagner – backing vocals (1, 5, 7)
Victor Szabo – backing vocals (1, 5, 7)
Jim Roll – banjo (6)
Keith Reed – double bass (4, 6, 9, 12)
Anna Schultz – cello (3, 4, 9, 13, 14)
Rachel Hsieh – cello (3, 8, 13, 14)
Andres Ivan Navedo – clarinet (12)
Brittni Troy – French horn (4, 9)
Eric Brummitt – French horn (4, 9)
Ben Began – mandolin (14)
Bobby Streng – saxophone (3, 4)
Melissa Gardiner – trombone (3, 4, 12)
Steve Peterson – trombone (5, 7)
David Tenerelli – trumpet (4, 5, 7)
Jeff Blim – trumpet (3, 12)
Matt Lyon – tuba (5, 7)
Michael Nickens – tuba (3, 4, 12)
Laurel Borden – viola (2, 4, 9, 13, 14)
Jeremy Kittel – violin (6)
Shawn Jaeger – violin (3, 4, 9, 13, 14)
Marvin Yagoda – voice (3, 15)
The Haiku Dinner Party – crowd (11)
Roberta Tamm – kid voice (9)
Taylor Janssen – kid voice (9)

Technical personnel
Patrick Fong – art direction, design
Zubin Sedghi – artwork
Court Jones – artwork [cover]
Joe Hawley – artwork [direction, design]
Austin Ash Lemon – artwork [back cover layout, 2021]
Ben Began – engineer
Bora Karaca – engineer [assistant]
Rudyard Lee Cullers – engineer [digital assembly]
Jennifer Tzar – photography
Tally Hall – producer

References

External links 
 Marvin's Marvelous Mechanical Museum on Needlejuice Records
 

2005 albums
Tally Hall albums
Museums in popular culture
Concept albums